Killadelphia is a live album by American heavy metal band Lamb of God in Philadelphia, October 2004, which was released by Epic Records as a DVD. It boasts the entire unabridged audio from the concert documented in the DVD of the same name. The CD was released on December 13, 2005, available with a special re-release version of the DVD or by itself in conventional CD packaging.

It was mixed by Machine, who also produced Lamb of God's Ashes of the Wake and Sacrament studio albums. The concert itself features songs from the band's first three studio albums, and even a song from the band's previous incarnation, Burn the Priest. Because it is a complete audio version of the concert, the CD is almost 70 minutes long and the transitions between tracks are seamless.

Track listing

References

Lamb of God (band) albums
2005 live albums